Jaclyn "Jackie" Jeschelnig-Ulm (born November 19, 1979 in Mentor, Ohio) is an American hammer thrower. A graduate of Ashland University, she won five NCAA Division II and nine Great Lakes Intercollegiate Athletic Conference championship titles in both the hammer and weight throw, and achieved a thirty-ninth-place finish at the 2004 Summer Olympics.

Career
Born and raised in Mentor, Ohio, Jeschelnig started her hammer throw career upon enrolling at Ashland University as a member of the track and field team for the Ashland Eagles under head coach Jud Logan. While competing for the Eagles, she compiled a record of fourteen titles throughout her four-year collegiate career; nine of which came from the Great Lakes Intercollegiate Athletic Conference (GLIAC)and five from the NCAA Division II Championships. On February 17, 2003, Jeschelnig was surprisingly featured in Sports Illustrated's Face of the Crowd magazine issue.

After graduating from Ashland University in May 2003 with a mathematics major, Jeschelnig joined with eight other athletes for Ashland Elite's athletic program, which was devised to help Olympic aspirants undergo rigorous training for future track and field meets.

Jeschelnig entered the 2004 Summer Olympics in Athens on her official international debut, as a member of the U.S. Olympic track and field team, in the women's hammer throw, along with fellow athletes Anna Mahon and Erin Gilreath. Jeschelnig started her opening throw with a satisfying distance of 58.00 m, before committing a startling foul on her second attempt. She extended a remarkable toss to 62.23 m on her third attempt, but it was not worthily enough to put her through to the final, leaving Jeschelnig in last place among the Americans and thirty-ninth overall against a field of forty-eight hammer throwers at the end of the qualifying round.

Personal life
Jeschelnig is assigned as an assistant head coach on the women's hammer throw team for the Ohio State Buckeyes at Ohio State University. Moreover, she resides with her husband and fellow thrower Rich Ulm and works as a client support manager at Quantum Health Center in Columbus, Ohio.

References

External links

Profile at USA Track & Field
Player Bio – Ashland Eagles

1979 births
Living people
American female hammer throwers
Olympic track and field athletes of the United States
Athletes (track and field) at the 2004 Summer Olympics
People from Ashland, Ohio
Sportspeople from Ohio
Ashland University alumni
21st-century American women